Lo mai chi, known in Mandarin as nuomici, is a type of Chinese pastry. It is one of the most standard pastries in Hong Kong. It can also be found in most Chinatown bakery shops overseas.It is also referred to as glutinous rice dumpling. Today there are many different modern variations such as green tea flavor, mango flavor, etc.It is similar to the Keralian dumpling Ada.

The glutinous rice ball can be dusted with dried coconut on the outside. The outer layer is made of a rice flour dough and the inside is typically filled with a sweet filling. The most common fillings are sugar with coconut and crumbled peanuts, red bean paste, and black sesame seed paste.

See also
Daifuku
Mochi
Ela Ada

References

Cantonese cuisine
Hong Kong cuisine
Chinese desserts
Foods containing coconut
Chinese bakery products
Glutinous rice dishes